This is a list of writers & authors from Mauritius who write in French, English or Hindi languages:

Nathacha Appanah (1973– ), Francophone writer
 Azize Asgarally (1933– ), Francophone, Anglophone and Creolophone writer, playwright and activist
 Issa Asgarally GCSK (1949- ), Francophone writer
 Richard Sedley Assonne (1961– ), Creolophone and francophone writer
 Eric Bahloo (1964- ), Francophone writer
 Deepchand Beeharry (1927- ), Anglophone and indophone writer
 Lilian Berthelot (1933-2012), Francophone writer
 Somdath Bhuckory (1921-1980), Francophone, Anglophone and Indophone writer. Lawyer and Town Clerk of Port Louis.
 Mohunlall Brijmohun (19– ), Indophone writer
 Marcel Cabon (1912–1972), Francophone novelist
 Aslakha Callikan-Proag (1955-2020), Francophone writer 
 Sabah Carrim (19– ), Anglophone writer
 Malcolm de Chazal (1902-1981), writer
 Raymond Chasle (1930–1996), Francophone diplomat and poet
Lindsey Collen (1948– ), Creolophone and anglophone novelist and essayist
Ananda Devi (1957– ), Francophone writer
 Monique Dinan (1939- ), Francophone writer and journalist
 Chit Dukhira (1939- ), Anglophone writer 
 Christine Duverge (1969– ), Francophone writer
 Ashvin Dwarka (1977- ), Francophone writer and lawyer
 Bernard d'Espaignet, Francophone writer
 Jacques Edouard (1964– ), Francophone journalist, poet and writer
 Jean Fanchette (1932–1992), Francophone poet and psychoanalyst
 Alain Gordon Gentil, Francophone writer and journalist
 Yacoob Ghanty (1940- ), Anglophone writer
 Robert-Edward Hart (1891–1954), Franco-Mauritian poet and novelist
 Shakuntala Hawoldar (1937–2018), Anglophone writer
 Kissoonsingh Hazareesingh, Anglophone and Francophone writer
 Sudhir Hazareesingh (1961- ), Anglophone and Francophone writer
 Evenor Hitié (1806-1901), Francophone writer
 Marie-Thérèse Humbert (1940– ) Francophone novelist
Davina Itoo (1983– ), Francophone novelist
 Yusuf Kadel (1970– ), Francophone poet and playwright
 Stefan Hart de Keating (1971– ), Francophone slam poet
 Raymonde de Kervern (1899–1973), Franco-Mauritian poet
 Marcelle Lagesse (1916-2011), Francophone writer and journalist
 Philippe Lenoir, Francophone and Anglophone writer
 Léoville L'Homme (1857–1928), Francophone poet
 Jagadish Manrakhan (1938-2013), Anglophone writer and academic
 Edouard Maunick (1931– ), Francophone poet, writer, and diplomat
 Savinien Mérédac (Auguste Esnouf)(1880-1939), Francophone writer and engineer
 Alex Camille Moutou, Anglophone and Francophone writer and historian
 Anand Mulloo (1936- ), Anglophone writer and teacher
 Amédée Nagapen, Francophone writer and priest
 Jean-René Noyau (1911–1986 ), Surrealist francophone poet
 Shenaz Patel (1966– ), Francophone and Creole story writer, playwright and novelist
 Cassandra (Sandrine) Piat (1973– ), anglophone writer
 Denis Piat (1943- ), francophone and anglophone writer
 Geneviève Pitot (1930-2002), structural engineer and author in German, French and English languages
 Ponsamy Poongavanon, francophone author 
 Jean-Georges Prosper (1933– ), francophone poet and author of the Mauritian national anthem
 Rivaltz Quenette (1928-2015), Anglophone and Francophone writer and historian
 Camille de Rauville (1910– ), Francophone writer
Ramesh Ramdoyal (197–), anglophone writer and academic
 Pahlad Ramsurrun, Anglophone and Indophone writer and poet
 Pierre Renaud (1921–1976), Francophone poet
 Karamchand Goswami Sewtohul, Anglophone, Francophone and Creole story writer
 Amal Sewtohul (1971–), Francophone writer and diplomat
 Natasha Soobramanien (197– ), anglophone writer
 Pierre De Sornay (1876-1968), francophone writer and agronomist
 Vijaya Teelock, Anglophone writer and historian
 Umar Timol (1970– ), francophone writer and poet
 Auguste Toussaint (1911-1987), francophone writer and archivist
 Saradha Soobrayen (1974– ), Anglophone poet
Abhimanyu Unnuth (1937–2018), Indophone writer, poet and essayist
Khal Torabully (1956– ), Francophone and Creolophone poet and film-maker
 Alix Marrier d'Unienville (1918-2015), Francophone and anglophone writer, war hero and former spy
 Moonindra Nath Varma (1929-2018), Anglophone writer
Dev Virahsawmy (1942– ), Creolophone poet, novelist and essayist
 Hassam Wachill (1939– ), Francophone poet

See also 
 List of African writers by country
 Mauritian literature
 List of poets
 List of African poets

References

Mauritius

Writers
Mauritian